U.S. Route 99 (US 99) was a main north–south United States Numbered Highway on the West Coast of the United States until 1964, running from Calexico, California, on the US–Mexico border to Blaine, Washington, on the U.S.-Canada border. It was assigned in 1926 and existed until it was replaced for the most part by Interstate 5. Known also as the "Golden State Highway" and "The Main Street of California", US 99 was important throughout much of the 1930s as a route for Dust Bowl immigrant farm workers to traverse the state. Large portions are now California State Route 99 (SR 99), Oregon's Routes 99, 99W, and 99E, and Washington's SR 99. The highway in Washington connected to British Columbia Highway 99, whose number was derived from that of US 99, at the Canada–US border.

Route description

California

The basic former route of U.S. Route 99 in California started at the Mexico–United States border in Calexico, and then ran north through the Imperial Valley and along the western shore of the Salton Sea to the Coachella Valley (roughly present-day California State Route 86 and California State Route 111). US 99 then headed west to Los Angeles (present-day Interstate 10), and then north again to the Central Valley (present-day Interstate 5). US 99 then continued along the present-day corridor of California State Route 99 to Bakersfield, Fresno, and Sacramento. In Sacramento, the highway split into two suffixed routes, 99W and 99E. US 99W roughly followed the route of present-day Interstate 5 on the western side of the Sacramento Valley, and US 99E followed present-day State Route 99 on the eastern side of the valley. Both highways merged back together in Red Bluff, and US 99 continued along the present-day Interstate 5 corridor to the Oregon border.

Oregon

The former route of U.S. Route 99 in Oregon mostly follows routes currently signed as Oregon Route 99, 99E, and 99W. The primary exception is from the California–Oregon state border north to Ashland, Oregon, where U.S. 99 is currently named Oregon Route 273 from the state border to Exit 6 of Interstate 5. The former route is coterminous with Interstate 5 from Exit 6 to the junction of Oregon Route 99 in Ashland.

Washington
Unlike California and Oregon, much of the former route of U.S. Highway 99 in Washington exists as local roads and regular city streets; only the route from Fife to Everett still retains the same number as State Route 99. US 99 went through two stages of redevelopment in Washington. The first was a general replacement of the original two-lane highway with a four-lane limited-access highway. At that time, the limited-access highway was badged as US 99, and any parallel original route was generally known as "old 99". The second phase was the development of an Interstate Highway, much of which followed the new 99 route and is known as I-5.

History

An extensive section of this highway (over 600 miles or 965 km), from approximately Stockton, California to Vancouver, Washington, follows very closely the track of the Siskiyou Trail.  The Siskiyou Trail was based on an ancient network of Native American Indian footpaths connecting the Pacific Northwest with California's Central Valley.  By the 1820s, trappers from the Hudson's Bay Company were the first non-Native Americans to use the route of U.S. Highway 99 to move between today's Washington state and California.  During the second half of the 19th Century, mule train trails, stagecoach roads, and the path of the Central Pacific railroad (later the Southern Pacific railroad) also followed the route of the Siskiyou Trail. By the early 20th Century, pioneering automobile roads were built along the Siskiyou Trail, including most notably the Pacific Highway. The Pacific Highway ran from British Columbia to San Diego, California and is the immediate predecessor of much of U.S. Highway 99. The highway was continuous pavement by the middle 1930s.

Decommissioning
By 1968, US 99 was completely decommissioned with the near completion of I-5 in Washington and California, but the highway's phasing out actually began July 1, 1964, due to the passage of Collier Senate Bill No. 64 on September 20, 1963. The bill launched a major program designed to greatly simplify California's increasingly complicated highway numbering system and eliminate concurrent postings.  The highways that replaced it are:

SR 111 and SR 86 between the Mexico–US border and Indio.
I-10, replacing US 60 and US 70 between Indio and Los Angeles as well.
U.S. Route 101 and SR 110 in downtown Los Angeles.
I-5 from north of downtown Los Angeles to its modern-day split in Wheeler Ridge before 99's final decommissioning in 1968.

In 1972, the AASHTO gave permission to the Oregon State Highway Commission to retire US 99W, US 99E and US 99 from the national system. The final segments of US 99 were then decommissioned and re-organized into OR 99W, OR 99E and OR 99.

State Highway 99
All three states have replaced some portions of US 99 with state highways of the same number:
 Washington:  of US 99, from Fife (in Pierce County) to Everett (in Snohomish County), is now State Route 99. It is mostly a surface-level highway with the exception of the SR 99 Tunnel through downtown Seattle. The tunnel was created to replace the Alaskan Way Viaduct, which was torn down in 2019. 
A 4-mile section of the old US 99 through unincorporated Hazel Dell and Salmon Creek, north of Vancouver, Washington is still known as NE Highway 99.
Other portions of the old US 99 are now designated as SR 505, SR 529 and SR 530.

 Oregon: Most of former US 99 in Oregon now signed as Oregon Route 99 (OR 99). The route still provides surface-level access to many southern Oregon towns served by I-5. It also provides access to many towns in the Willamette Valley.  Between Junction City and Portland, the highway splits into eastern and western routes known as OR 99E and OR 99W, respectively.  For significant stretches, OR 99 shares an alignment with I-5.  Officially, the highway is signed with both route numbers when this occurs; however, in practice, this is often not the case as the OR 99 designation is dropped in favor of I-5.  One notable exception is a stretch of OR 99E that runs between Albany and Salem, where OR 99E is cosigned along the highway.
 California: The  stretch between Wheeler Ridge and Red Bluff is signed as State Route 99 which makes it California's second-longest state highway behind SR 1. However, the newly enacted Historic U.S. Route 99 extends from Indio starting from Interstate 10 in the Coachella Valley all the way down the Imperial Valley to Calexico on the US-Mexico border with Mexicali, Baja California, Mexico.

Major intersections

California
 at U.S.–Mexico border in Calexico
 in El Centro
 near Colton
 in Los Angeles
 in Los Angeles
 in Los Angeles
 from Los Angeles to Newhall Pass
 from Famoso to Bakersfield
 in Greenfield, CA
 from Sacramento to French Camp
 from Davis to Roseville
 in Redding
 in Weed

Oregon
 in Grants Pass
 in Eugene
 in Corvallis/Albany
 in Portland
 in Portland

Washington
 from near Kelso to Vancouver
 in Olympia
 in Seattle
 in Everett
 at Canada–US border in Blaine

Special routes

US Route 99W (California)

US 99W in California ran from Red Bluff, where it diverged from highway 99E, and headed to Sacramento. This section of the highway ran through towns such as Corning, Orland, Willows, Artois, Williams, and Maxwell. This section of the highway runs parallel with current day Interstate 5.

US Route 99E (California) 

US 99E in California ran from Red Bluff, where it split with highway 99W and merged with California State Route 36, then split and headed south to Sacramento. This section of the highway ran through towns such as Chico, Durham, Richvale, and Yuba City. This section of the highway is currently used as part of California's State Route 99.

US Route 99W (Oregon)

US 99W in Oregon ran from Junction City, where it diverged from highway 99E, to Portland. The US designation was redesignated as Oregon Route 99W in 1972. In 1994, Oregon 99W was truncated to Interstate 5 in Tigard at Exit 294. As such, highways 99W and 99E no longer converge.

US Route 99E (Oregon)

US 99E in Oregon ran from Junction City, where it diverged from highway 99W, to Portland, but using a different route than highway 99W. A segment between Albany and Salem is cosigned with Interstate 5. Like its western counterpart, US 99E was changed to state highway 99E in 1972. Its current northern terminus is at Interstate 5 in Delta Park near the Portland Expo Center at Exit 307.

Alternate routes in Washington

Two routes in Washington were designated US Route 99 Alternate, at the same time and in both passing through Bellingham.

In 1931, the current Lake Samish route of US 99 was constructed (which is similar to the route of today's Interstate 5), and US 99 was moved to this new road. As a result, the old road, Chuckanut Drive, was designated as US 99 Alternate. Today, this route is Washington State Route 11.

Beginning in 1952, US Route 99 Alternate began in downtown Bellingham and went due north to Lynden and then to Canada along the Guide Meridian. This highway was decommissioned in 1969 and is today known as Washington State Route 539.

Both of these routes were renumbered in the 1960s when the state decommissioned all of US Route 99 and scrapped its entire highway system to replace it with a new system.

Legacy
Travel on U.S. Route 99 is highlighted in a long poem by Gary Snyder, "Night Highway 99". The Sega videogame Sonic Advance 3 has a zone titled "Route 99," but this could be coincidental.

Route 99 was planned to be featured in Pixar's Cars 3, as confirmed by Michael Wallis. However, this never went through.

See also

U.S. Route 199
U.S. Route 299 (Decommissioned)
U.S. Route 399 (Decommissioned)

References

External links

Museum of the Siskiyou Trail
Information on the Ridge Route
Ridge Route Preservation Organization
 (Photos, text, TV shows)
Clark's Travel Center and Route 99 Museum, Indio, California
Finding Historic Route 99
Historic Highway 99 Association of California
Highways of Washington State – US 99
Virtual Tour of US 99 in Southern California
Historic endpoints of US 99
Old Highway 99 City of Bellingham
https://www.redding.com/story/news/2017/10/21/signs-recall-days-when-old-highway-99-busy-route-mountain-gate/780505001/

 
99
99
99
99
99